The Michigan Women's Hall of Fame (MWHOF) honors distinguished women, both historical and contemporary, who have been associated with the U.S. state of Michigan. The hall of fame was founded in 1983 by Gladys Beckwith and is sponsored by the Michigan Women's Studies Association. The formation of the Association and the Hall was prompted by five professors from Michigan State University, who were teaching a Women in American Society course.

Nominations to the hall of fame are accepted from the public and are open to women who rose to prominence or were born in Michigan, as well as those who have lived in the state for an extended period. A screening committee ranks the nominations by merit and a second committee makes the final determination, generally selecting eight to ten women annually for induction. Inductees are honored at a ceremony and dinner in October and are presented with a bronze Lifetime Achievement Award. As of 2021, the Hall of Fame contains over 340 inductees.

The MWHOF was housed in the Cooley-Haze House, built in 1903 and located at 213 W. Malcolm X St. (formerly W. Main Street), directly south of downtown Lansing, Michigan. It contained a resource library, as well as exhibit galleries dedicated to preserving and presenting Michigan women's history and art. The house was opened to the public on June 10, 1987. The Center also contained the Belen Gallery, which featured art from Michigan women.

Michigan Women's Historical Center and Hall of Fame moved to its current location in Meridian Mall, 110 W. Allegan St., Suite 10 in 2017. MWHC

Hall of Fame honorees

References

Further reading

External links
 Virtual Gallery of Honorees
 Michigan Women's Hall of Fame Nomination Form
 The Michigan Women's Historical Center & Hall of Fame

Michigan culture
Lists of American women
Women's halls of fame
Education in Lansing, Michigan
Halls of fame in Michigan
State halls of fame in the United States
Lists of hall of fame inductees
Biographical museums in Michigan
Women's museums in the United States
Museums in Lansing, Michigan
Awards established in 1987
Women in Michigan
History of women in Michigan